The World Sudoku Championship (WSC) is an annual international puzzle competition organised by a member of the World Puzzle Federation. The first event was held in Lucca in 2006. National teams are determined by local affiliates of the World Puzzle Federation. The competition typically consists of 100 or more puzzles solved by all competitors over multiple timed rounds, including classic sudoku, variations and other puzzle types, normally followed by a playoff for the top qualifiers to determine a champion. Examples of rounds include the Relay round, where an answer from one puzzle contributes digits to the start of the next sudoku, and the "World Record" round, in which solvers competed to set a Guinness World Record for fastest sudoku solution.

Of the 15 championships held so far, Kota Morinishi of Japan (2014, 2015, 2017 and 2018) has been the most successful winner with four individual titles, over Thomas Snyder of United States (2007, 2008 and 2011), Jan Mrozowski of Poland (2009, 2010 and 2012) who have each won three.

From 2007 there has also been a team competition.  Japan is the most successful team, having won the title in 2007, 2012, 2014, 2015 and 2018; Czech Republic (2008, 2016), Germany (2010 and 2011) and China (2013, 2017) have won this title twice; Slovakia (2009) also won a title.

Starting from 2011, the event has been held alongside the World Puzzle Championship.

Participants 
Currently, 30 countries are official members of the World Puzzle Federation. Individuals may also take part if their country is not already represented by a national team.

Results summary
 

Starting from 2013, titles have been awarded also for the best players in two age groups, Under 18 and Over 50 years of age.

References

External links

Official web site of the World Puzzle Federation
2022: Official web site of the 15th WSC and 29th WPC
2015: Official web site of the 10th WSC and 24th WPC
2014: Official web site of the 9th WSC and 23rd WPC
2013: Official web site of the 8th WSC and 22nd WPC
2012: Official web site of the 7th WSC and 21st WPC
2011: Official web site of the 6th WSC and 20th WPC
2010: 5th WSC April 29-May 2, 2010 Philadelphia, United States 
4th WSC April 24–27, 2009 Žilina, Slovakia 
2008: 3rd WSC Goa, India
2007: 2nd WSC Prague, Czech Republic
2006: 1st WSC Lucca, Italy

Sudoku competitions
Puzzle competitions
Recurring sporting events established in 2006
2006 establishments in China